Toru Hara (born 5 January 1962) is a Japanese weightlifter. He competed in the men's bantamweight event at the 1988 Summer Olympics.

References

External links
 

1962 births
Living people
Japanese male weightlifters
Olympic weightlifters of Japan
Weightlifters at the 1988 Summer Olympics
Place of birth missing (living people)